Joseph Torrey may refer to:

 Joseph Torrey (academic) (1797–1867), American professor of philosophy and acting president of the University of Vermont
 Joseph William Torrey (1828–1885), American merchant
 Joseph W. Torrey (politician) (died 1844), Michigan politician